Renato da Cunha Sobral (born 7 September 1975), also known as "Babalu", is a retired Brazilian Luta Livre submission grappler, mixed martial artist, and was the former Strikeforce Light Heavyweight Champion. Sobral previously fought in the Ultimate Fighting Championship, where he posted a 6–4 record and has also competed for Bellator, RINGS, Jungle Fight, Cage Rage, Affliction, and ONE Championship. He is the Head Instructor of Babalu's Iron Gym Cerritos and has a Luta Livre black belt under Marco Ruas and also a Brazilian jiu-jitsu black belt under Carlos Gracie Jr.

Background
Sobral is originally from Rio de Janeiro, Brazil and began competing in wrestling from a young age of nine. Sobral later went on to be a South American Wrestling Champion in 1998, a three-time Brazilian National Wrestling Champion in 1998, 1999, and 2000, and was a Brazilian National Muay Thai Champion in 1992. Sobral joined the Gracie Barra Combat Team and trained in Ruas Vale Tudo, a martial arts system developed by Marco Ruas.

Mixed martial arts career

Early career
Sobral made his professional mixed martial arts debut on 27 September 1997 in his hometown of Rio de Janeiro. He won all three of his fights on the same night by strikes and then had a one-fight stint in International Vale Tudo before fighting in Brazilian Vale Tudo on 24 July 1999. Sobral again won all three of his fights that night and then made his debut in the Japanese RINGS organization.

RINGS
Sobral made his RINGS debut against Georgian wrestler Zaza Tkeshelashvili and won via kimura arm submission. He followed this up with a unanimous decision win over British kickboxer Lee Hasdell.

Still undefeated, he participated in the King of Kings 1999 Final, winning his first two fights of the day before being handed his first career loss by Dan Henderson. Sobral lost the fight via minority decision, two judges scored the bout a draw while a third judge scored the bout in Henderson's favor.

Sobral then won his next four consecutive fights before losing to Valentijn Overeem by a toe hold submission.

After a one-fight stint in the UFC, he fought in RINGS three more times. He defeated Kiyoshi Tamura via majority decision, followed this up with another majority decision win over Tsuyoshi Kohsaka. Sobral then faced Fedor Emilianenko at the 10th Anniversary show and lost via unanimous decision.

Ultimate Fighting Championship
Sobral made his UFC debut at UFC 28 against former UFC Heavyweight Champion Maurice Smith. Sobral won the fight via unanimous decision.

Sobral next fought Kevin Randleman at UFC 35 on January 11, 2002. He lost via unanimous decision.

Sobral's next fight was against Elvis Sinosic at UFC 38 on July 13, 2002. He won via unanimous decision.

Sobral next fought Chuck Liddell at UFC 40 on November 22, 2002. He lost via head kick in the first round.

He left the UFC in early 2003 and fought for minor and local promotions until his return in 2005.

Sobral returned to the UFC at UFC 52 against Travis Wiuff on April 16, 2005. He won the fight via armbar in the second round.

Sobral next fought future Middleweight and Light Heavyweight title challenger Chael Sonnen at UFC 55 on October 7, 2005. He won the fight via triangle choke in the second round.

Sobral's next fight was at UFC 57 against Mike Van Arsdale on February 4, 2006. He won the fight via rear naked choke in the first round.

At UFC 62, Sobral was defeated by Chuck Liddell in a rematch for the UFC Light Heavyweight Championship. The match was stopped as a technical knockout at 95 seconds into the first round. 

Following his loss to Liddell, Sobral faced Jason Lambert at UFC 68. Sobral was knocked out in the second round.

UFC 74 controversy
Sobral's next fight was at UFC 74 against David Heath. The first round consisted of Sobral ground and pounding Heath. In the second round, he opened a cut on Heath's forehead which bled profusely. Sobral secured another takedown and then worked to an anaconda choke. Heath tapped out, but Sobral continued to hold the anaconda
choke, ignoring referee Steve Mazzagatti's commands and resisting his attempts to break the hold. Sobral did not release the choke until Heath passed out from hypoxia. During his post-fight interview, Sobral told UFC commentator Joe Rogan that he was aware that Heath had tapped, but "he (Heath) has to learn respect. He deserved that. He called me motherfucker." In his dressing room after the fight, Sobral spoke to Las Vegas Journal-Review columnist Ed Graney. Sobral then mocked the crowd for booing him, saying "The crowd didn't like it? Who cares? At least they had a reaction."

On 30 August 2007, Sobral was released from his contractual obligations by the UFC due to his actions at UFC 74, with UFC President Dana White calling Sobral's actions "completely unacceptable. This is the fight game and shit happens. But no way can you do what he did." White also supported the fans attitude towards Sobral after the fight. "I think you saw the response from the fans. Babalu was a fan favorite. They turned on him immediately." Additionally, the Nevada State Athletic Commission withheld $25,000 of Sobral's $50,000 fight purse and convened a hearing to deal with both his holding the choke and ignoring Mazzagatti's orders.

Strikeforce and Affliction
After the termination of his deal with the UFC, Renato Sobral was courted by numerous promotions looking to sign him.  During the 29 September Strikeforce event at the Playboy Mansion it was announced that Sobral had signed a non-exclusive deal with Strikeforce. It has since been revealed that he signed two more non-exclusive deals with Hardcore Championship Fighting and Xcess Fighting. Sobral also later competed in an event for the Ring of Fire promotion, defeating K-1 veteran Rodney Faverus by submission (arm triangle choke).

Sobral was scheduled to fight fellow UFC veteran Vernon "Tiger" White in a match to crown the first WCO Light Heavyweight Champion. However, because the show's promoters were unable to secure adequate funding to pay the fighters, the show was canceled at the last minute by the California State Athletic Commission.

Sobral then signed with Affliction Entertainment's MMA promotion and appeared at Affliction: Banned on 19 July, defeating Mike Whitehead by unanimous decision. Sobral's next fight was against Bobby Southworth in San Jose, California on 21 November for the Strikeforce promotion. Babalu defeated Southworth via TKO due to a cut over the right eye in between round one and two, making him the Strikeforce Light Heavyweight Champion.

Sobral next fought his second fight for Affliction, this time against Sokoudjou at Affliction: Day of Reckoning on 24 January 2009 in a light heavyweight fight. The fight ended in the second round when Babalu submitted Sokoudjou with a D'arce choke. After his victory he showed an interest in fighting former UFC Light Heavyweight Champion, Tito Ortiz.

Sobral was set to fight fellow Brazilian Rafael "Feijao" Cavalcante at the past event Strikeforce Presents: Lawler Vs. Shields in St. Louis, Missouri on 6 June 2009, but the bout was scratched. The bout would have been for the Strikeforce Light Heavyweight Championship.

Sobral was next set to make his third appearance for Affliction in a fight against Gegard Mousasi at Affliction: Trilogy, but the event was canceled after losing its main event. The fight was then moved to Strikeforce's 15 August card, Strikeforce: Carano vs. Cyborg and changed into a bout for the Strikeforce Light Heavyweight Championship with Sobral as the titleholder. Sobral lost the title to Mousasi via knockout in the first round.

Sobral last fought Robbie Lawler in a 195 lbs Catchweight bout on 16 June 2010 at Strikeforce: Los Angeles. Renato Sobral won via unanimous decision.

After defeating Robbie Lawler it was believed that Sobral would face Muhammed Lawal for the Strikeforce Light Heavyweight title. However, in his post-fight interview Sobral stated that he would not fight Lawal and instead requested a rematch with Dan Henderson who he fought over ten years ago.

Sobral's request was later fulfilled and he fought Dan Henderson at Strikeforce: Henderson vs. Babalu II on 4 December 2010. Sobral was knocked out in the first round.

ONE Championship
In late December 2011, After one year of inactivity Sobral signed an exclusive deal with Singaporean MMA promotion ONE Championship also known as ONE FC, ONE FC officials stated that Sobral has "global exclusivity" with the promotion. Sobral was slated to fight Melvin Manhoef on 31 March 2012 at ONE Fighting Championship 3 which was to be held at the Singapore Indoor Stadium in Kallang, Singapore but the two sides were unable to agree on a weight and he instead became the wrestling coach in Wanderlei Silva's team on The Ultimate Fighter: Brazil.

Sobral returned to action in the main event of ONE FC 4 on 23 June. He defeated Tatsuya Mizuno at ONE FC: Destiny of Warriors in Kuala Lumpur, via an armbar submission in the first round.  The stoppage came less than a minute into the first round.

Bellator Fighting Championships
Sobral faced Combat Sambo Russia National Champion Mikhail Zayats on 17 January 2013 at Bellator 85. He lost the fight via TKO in the first round.

Despite the loss, Sobral competed in Bellator's Light Heavyweight summer series tournament on Spike.  He faced Jacob Noe in the opening round of a 4-man tournament at Bellator 96 on 19 June 2013. Sobral lost when the referee stopped the fight for a standing TKO. After the fight, Sobral announced his retirement from MMA.

Metamoris III
Dean Lister and Renato Sobral fought to a draw at Metamoris 3 a submission only jiu-jitsu match.

Metamoris VI
Chael Sonnen and Renato Sobral fought to a draw in a trilogy fight at Metamoris 6 a submission only jiu-jitsu match.

Personal life
Sobral and his wife Natasha have two daughters, who were born in May 2009. He has both their names tattooed on him.

His nickname comes from a brand of bubblegum that he used to chew (Bubbaloo).

In October 2008 he opened his own gym, Gracie Barra Cerritos'', in Cerritos, California.

In 2010, his gym changed to Babalu's Iron Gym, in Cerritos, California.

Sobral was awarded his Brazilian jiu-jitsu 3rd Degree Black Belt in August 2017 from Roberto “Gordo” Correa – 6th degree black belt by FJJ in Rio de Janeiro.

Appeared in the video Still I Rise by the American heavy metal band Shadows Fall.

In May 2019 Sobral revealed that he was suffering from symptoms consistent with early onset of CTE.

Championships and accomplishments

Mixed martial arts
Strikeforce
Strikeforce Light Heavyweight Championship (One time)
Fighting Network RINGS
1999 RINGS King of Kings Tournament Runner-up
International Fighting Championships
International Fighting Championships Light Heavyweight Tournament Winner

Amateur wrestling
International Federation of Associated Wrestling Styles
2001 Pan American Championships Senior Freestyle (6th Place)
Confederação Brasileira de Lutas Associadas
Brazil Senior Freestyle National Championship (1998)

Mixed martial arts record

|-
| Loss
| align=center| 37–12
| Jacob Noe
| TKO (punches)
| Bellator 96
| 
| align=center| 3
| align=center| 3:32
| Thackerville, Oklahoma, United States
| 
|-
| Loss
| align=center| 37–11
| Mikhail Zayats
| TKO (punches)
| Bellator 85
| 
| align=center| 1
| align=center| 4:49
| Irvine, California, United States
| 
|-
| Win
| align=center| 37–10
| Tatsuya Mizuno
| Submission (armbar)
| ONE FC: Destiny of Warriors
| 
| align=center| 1
| align=center| 0:31
| Kuala Lumpur, Malaysia
| 
|-
| Loss
| align=center| 36–10
| Dan Henderson
| KO (punches)
| Strikeforce: Henderson vs. Babalu II
| 
| align=center| 1
| align=center| 1:53
| Missouri, United States
| 
|-
| Win
| align=center| 36–9
| Robbie Lawler
| Decision (unanimous)
| Strikeforce: Los Angeles
| 
| align=center| 3
| align=center| 5:00
| California, United States
| 

|-
| Loss
| align=center| 35–9
| Gegard Mousasi
| KO (punches)
| Strikeforce: Carano vs. Cyborg
| 
| align=center| 1
| align=center| 1:00
| California, United States
| 
|-
| Win
| align=center| 35–8
| Rameau Thierry Sokoudjou
| Submission (D'Arce choke)
| Affliction: Day of Reckoning
| 
| align=center| 2
| align=center| 2:36
| California, United States
| 
|-
| Win
| align=center| 34–8
| Bobby Southworth
| TKO (doctor stoppage)
| Strikeforce: Destruction
| 
| align=center| 1
| align=center| 5:00
| California, United States
| 
|-
| Win
| align=center| 33–8
| Mike Whitehead
| Decision (unanimous)
| Affliction: Banned
| 
| align=center| 3
| align=center| 5:00
| California, United States
| 
|-
| Win
| align=center| 32–8
| Rodney Glunder
| Submission (arm-triangle choke)
| Ring of Fire 30: Babalu vs. Glunder
| 
| align=center| 3
| align=center| 3:31
| Colorado, United States
| 
|-
| Win
| align=center| 31–8
| David Heath
| Technical Submission (anaconda choke)
| UFC 74
| 
| align=center| 2
| align=center| 3:30
| Nevada, United States
| 
|-
| Loss
| align=center| 30–8
| Jason Lambert
| KO (punch)
| UFC 68
| 
| align=center| 2
| align=center| 3:26
| Ohio, United States
|  
|-
| Loss
| align=center| 30–7
| Chuck Liddell
| TKO (punches)
| UFC 62: Liddell vs. Sobral
| 
| align=center| 1
| align=center| 1:35
| Nevada, United States
| 
|-
| Win
| align=center| 30–6
| Mike van Arsdale
| Submission (rear-naked choke)
| UFC 57: Liddell vs. Couture 3
| 
| align=center| 1
| align=center| 2:21
| Nevada, United States
| 
|-
| Win
| align=center| 29–6
| Chael Sonnen
| Submission (triangle choke)
| UFC 55: Fury
| 
| align=center| 2
| align=center| 1:20
| Connecticut, United States
| 
|-
| Win
| align=center| 28–6
| Travis Wiuff
| Submission (armbar)
| UFC 52: Couture vs Liddell
| 
| align=center| 2
| align=center| 0:24
| Nevada, United States
| 
|-
| Win
| align=center| 27–6
| Pierre Guillet
| TKO (submission to punches)
| Cage Rage 10
| 
| align=center| 1
| align=center| 1:57
| London, United Kingdom
| 
|-
| Win
| align=center| 26–6
| Cyrille Diabaté
| Submission (guillotine choke)
| Cage Rage 9
| 
| align=center| 1
| align=center| 3:38
| London, United Kingdom
| 
|-
| Win
| align=center| 25–6
| José Landi-Jons
| Decision (unanimous)
| Jungle Fight 3
| 
| align=center| 3
| align=center| 5:00
| Manaus, Brazil
| 
|-
| Win
| align=center| 24–6
| Jeremy Horn
| Decision (unanimous)
| IFC: Global Domination
| 
| align=center| 3
| align=center| 5:00
| Colorado, United States
| 
|-
| Win
| align=center| 23–6
| Maurício Rua
| Submission (guillotine choke)
| IFC: Global Domination
| 
| align=center| 3
| align=center| 3:07
| Colorado, United States
| 
|-
| Win
| align=center| 22–6
| Trevor Prangley
| Decision (unanimous)
| IFC: Global Domination
| 
| align=center| 3
| align=center| 5:00
| Colorado, United States
| 
|-
| Win
| align=center| 21–6
| Marcelo Azevedo
| Decision (unanimous)
| Heat FC 1: Genesis
| 
| align=center| 3
| align=center| 5:00
| Rio Grande do Norte, Brazil
| 
|-
| Loss
| align=center| 20–6
| Chael Sonnen
| Decision 
| Hitman Fighting 3
| 
| align=center| N/A
| align=center| N/A
| Santa Ana, California, United States
| 
|-
| Loss
| align=center| 20–5
| Chuck Liddell
| KO (head kick)
| UFC 40
| 
| align=center| 1
| align=center| 2:55
| Nevada, United States
| 
|-
| Win
| align=center| 20–4
| Elvis Sinosic
| Decision (unanimous)
| UFC 38
| 
| align=center| 3
| align=center| 5:00
| London, United Kingdom
| 
|-
| Loss
| align=center| 19–4
| Kevin Randleman
| Decision (unanimous)
| UFC 35
| 
| align=center| 3
| align=center| 5:00
| Connecticut, United States
| 
|-
| Loss
| align=center| 19–3
| Fedor Emelianenko
| Decision (unanimous)
| Rings: 10th Anniversary
| 
| align=center| 2
| align=center| 5:00
| Tokyo, Japan
| 
|-
| Win
| align=center| 19–2
| Tsuyoshi Kohsaka
| Decision (majority)
| Rings: World Title Series 2
| 
| align=center| 2
| align=center| 5:00
| Tokyo, Japan
| 
|-
| Win
| align=center| 18–2
| Kiyoshi Tamura
| Decision (majority)
| Rings: King of Kings 2000 Final
| 
| align=center| 2
| align=center| 5:00
| Tokyo, Japan
| 
|-
| Win
| align=center| 17–2
| Maurice Smith
| Decision (unanimous)
| UFC 28
| 
| align=center| 3
| align=center| 5:00
| New Jersey, United States
| 
|-
| Loss
| align=center| 16–2
| Valentijn Overeem
| Submission (toe hold)
| Rings: King of Kings 2000 Block A
| 
| align=center| 1
| align=center| 2:19
| Tokyo, Japan
| 
|-
| Win
| align=center| 16–1
| Tariel Bitsadze
| Submission (armbar)
| Rings: King of Kings 2000 Block A
| 
| align=center| 1
| align=center| 2:58
| Tokyo, Japan
| 
|-
| Win
| align=center| 15–1
| Hiromitsu Kanehara
| Decision (unanimous)
| Rings: Millennium Combine 2
| 
| align=center| 2
| align=center| 5:00
| Tokyo, Japan
| 
|-
| Win
| align=center| 14–1
| Jacob Zobnin
| Submission (rear-naked choke)
| Rings Russia: Russia vs. The World
| 
| align=center| 1
| align=center| 3:20
| Tokyo, Japan
| 
|-
| Win
| align=center| 13–1
| Travis Fulton
| Submission (armbar)
| Rings: Millennium Combine 1
| 
| align=center| 1
| align=center| 4:49
| Tokyo, Japan
| 
|-
| Loss
| align=center| 12–1
| Dan Henderson
| Decision (majority)
| Rings: King of Kings 1999 Final
| 
| align=center| 2
| align=center| 5:00
| Tokyo, Japan
|
|-
| Win
| align=center| 12–0
| Kiyoshi Tamura
| Decision (majority)
| Rings: King of Kings 1999 Final
| 
| align=center| 2
| align=center| 5:00
| Tokyo, Japan
| 
|-
| Win
| align=center| 11–0
| Mikhail Ilyukhin
| Submission (armbar)
| Rings: King of Kings 1999 Final
| 
| align=center| 3
| align=center| 0:40
| Tokyo, Japan
| 
|-
| Win
| align=center| 10–0
| Brad Kohler
| KO (soccer kick)
| WEF: Goin' Platinum
| 
| align=center| 2
| align=center| 0:50
| Georgia, United States
| 
|-
| Win
| align=center| 9–0
| Lee Hasdell
| Decision (unanimous)
| Rings: King of Kings 1999 Block A
| 
| align=center| 2
| align=center| 5:00
| Tokyo, Japan
| 
|-
| Win
| align=center| 8–0
| Zaza Tkeshelashvili
| Submission (kimura)
| Rings: King of Kings 1999 Block A
| 
| align=center| 2
| align=center| 1:11
| Tokyo, Japan
| 
|-
| Win
| align=center| 7–0
| Dario Amorim
| TKO (submission to punches)
| BVF 14: Circuito Brasileiro de Vale Tudo 5
| 
| align=center| 1
| align=center| 2:14
| Rio de Janeiro, Brazil
| 
|-
| Win
| align=center| 6–0
| Pedro Otavio
| TKO (submission to punches)
| BVF 14: Circuito Brasileiro de Vale Tudo 5
| 
| align=center| 1
| align=center| 4:34
| Rio de Janeiro, Brazil
| 
|-
| Win
| align=center| 5–0
| Augusto Menezes Santos
| Submission (americana)
| BVF 14: Circuito Brasileiro de Vale Tudo 5
| 
| align=center| 1
| align=center| 0:56
| Rio de Janeiro, Brazil
| 
|-
| Win
| align=center| 4–0
| Fernando Cerchiari
| KO (punches)
| IVC 8: The Road Back to the Top
| 
| align=center| 1
| align=center| 4:41
| Aracaju, Brazil
| 
|-
| Win
| align=center| 3–0
| Marco Vinicios
| TKO (retirement)
| Desafio: Rio vs. São Paulo
| 
| align=center| 2
| align=center| 4:58
| Rio de Janeiro, Brazil
| 
|-
| Win
| align=center| 2–0
| Manoel Vicente
| TKO (punches and stomp)
| Desafio: Rio vs. São Paulo
| 
| align=center| 1
| align=center| 6:27
| Rio de Janeiro, Brazil
| 
|-
| Win
| align=center| 1–0
| Claudio Palma
| TKO (submission to leg kicks)
| Desafio: Rio vs. São Paulo
| 
| align=center| 1
| align=center| 2:08
| Rio de Janeiro, Brazil
|

Submission grappling record 
{| class="wikitable sortable" style="font-size:80%; text-align:left;"
|-
| colspan=8 style="text-align:center;" | 4 Matches, 0 Wins, 1 Losses, 3 Draws
|-
!  Result
!  Rec.
!  Opponent
!  Method
!  text-center| Event
!  Date
!  Location
|-
| Draw ||align=center|0–1–3||  Clay Guida || Draw || Quintet Ultra || December 12, 2019 ||  Las Vegas, Nevada
|-
| Loss ||align=center|0–1–2||  Roberto Godoi || Decision · Points || BJJ Stars: Black Belt Edition || February 24, 2019 ||  São Paulo, Brazil
|-
| Draw ||align=center|0–0–2||  Chael Sonnen || Draw || Metamoris 6 || May 9, 2015 ||  Los Angeles, California
|-
| Draw ||align=center|0–0–1||  Dean Lister || Draw || Metamoris 3 || March 9, 2014 ||  Los Angeles, California 
|-

See also
List of male mixed martial artists
List of ONE Championship alumni
List of Bellator MMA alumni

References

External links
 B.I.G. (Babalu's Iron Gym)
 
 

Brazilian male mixed martial artists
Light heavyweight mixed martial artists
Mixed martial artists utilizing catch wrestling
Mixed martial artists utilizing Luta Livre
Mixed martial artists utilizing Muay Thai
Mixed martial artists utilizing Brazilian jiu-jitsu
Strikeforce (mixed martial arts) champions
Ultimate Fighting Championship male fighters
Sportspeople from Rio de Janeiro (city)
Brazilian expatriate sportspeople in the United States
Living people
1975 births
Brazilian practitioners of Brazilian jiu-jitsu
People awarded a black belt in Brazilian jiu-jitsu
Brazilian submission wrestlers
Brazilian male sport wrestlers
Brazilian catch wrestlers
Brazilian Muay Thai practitioners